Mount Scott is a horseshoe-shaped massif on Kyiv Peninsula, the west coast of Graham Land, which is open to the southwest with its convex side fronting on Girard Bay and its northwestern side on Lemaire Channel.

Discovered by the Belgian Antarctic Expedition, 1897–99. Mapped by Dr. Jean-Baptiste Charcot, leader of the fourth French Antarctic Expedition, 1908–10, and named for Royal Navy Captain Robert Falcon Scott.

Duseberg Buttress stands at the southwest side of Mount Scott.

References

 SCAR Composite Gazetteer of Antarctica.

Mountains of Graham Land
Graham Coast